Mark Worthington (born 8 June 1983) is an Australian basketball player for the Willetton Tigers of the NBL1 West. He played 11 seasons in the National Basketball League (NBL).

Early life and career
Born in Bunbury, Western Australia, Worthington grew up in the nearby town of Australind, where he attended Australind Primary School and Australind Senior High School. He played for the Bunbury Slammers as a youth and started his career as a development player for the Cairns Taipans.

College career
Worthington played college basketball in the United States at Metropolitan State University of Denver under coach Mike Dunlap from 2001 to 2005. He won the NABC Division II Player of the Year award in 2004–05.

Professional career
After a standout career at Metro State, Worthington made his debut with the Sydney Kings of the National Basketball League, winning the NBL Rookie of the Year Award in 2005–06. He played three seasons with the Kings, before signing with the South Dragons for the 2008–09 season. He helped the Dragons win the NBL championship before they folded in 2009. He subsequently signed with the Melbourne Tigers for the 2009–10 season. In 2010, he had a stint with German team Brose Baskets.

For the 2010–11 season, Worthington joined the Gold Coast Blaze. In 2011, he had stints with Puerto Rican teams Mets de Guaynabo and Piratas de Quebradillas, before returning to the Blaze for the 2011–12 season.

In July 2012, Worthington signed with Serbian team Radnički Kragujevac. He suffered a season-ending injury in December 2012, forcing him to eventually leave Kragujevac in February 2013. He played 14 games, averaging 10.2 points and 3.6 rebounds per game.

On 18 July 2013, Worthington signed with the Melbourne Tigers, returning to the club for a second stint. In May 2014, the Tigers changed their name to United.

On 7 July 2015, Worthington signed a two-year deal with the Cairns Taipans. On 13 January 2016, he played his 300th NBL game. On 22 January 2017, Worthington announced his decision to retire at the end of the 2016–17 season. His 335th and final NBL game came in the Taipans' game two semi-final loss to the Perth Wildcats on 20 February 2017 at Perth Arena.

Worthington was named in the Sydney Kings 25th Anniversary Team in 2013 and the Basketball WA Hall of Fame in 2022.

On 2 March 2023, Worthington came out of retirement as a 39-year-old and signed with the Willetton Tigers of the NBL1 West for the 2023 season.

National team career
Worthington made his debut for the Australian national team in 2005 at the FIBA Oceania Championship. He has since played for them at the 2008 Summer Olympics in Beijing, and four years later in London, as well as at the FIBA World Championship in 2006 and 2010.

Coaching career
In February 2016, Worthington was appointed head coach of QBL women's side, the Cairns Dolphins. After two seasons with the Dolphins, Worthington spent the 2017–18 U.S. college season as an assistant coach with the Loyola Marymount Lions men's basketball team. In October 2019, Worthington was appointed head coach of SBL men's side, the South West Slammers, for the 2020 season. He coached them in the inaugural season of the NBL1 West in 2021.

Personal life
Worthington's father, Greg, is a basketball coach who has been involved with the South West Slammers. His brother, Trent, played for many years with the Slammers' SBL team.

Worthington and his wife, Andrea, have two sons, Taz and Axel.

In August 2012, it was announced that Worthington was considering a switch to play Australian rules football for the West Coast Eagles. His uncle, Kevin Worthington played for the Collingwood, Claremont and Perth football clubs in the 1970s and 1980s.

References

External links
 Mark Worthington at taipans.com
 Mark Worthington at eurocupbasketball.com
 Mark Worthington at olympics.com.au
 "Coming Home" at nbl.com.au
 "Former NBL star comes up from down under" at laloyolan.com
 
 2022 Basketball WA Hall of Fame Inductee interview

1983 births
Living people
ABA League players
Australian expatriate basketball people in Germany
Australian expatriate basketball people in Serbia
Australian expatriate basketball people in the United States
Australian men's basketball players
Basketball players at the 2006 Commonwealth Games
Basketball players at the 2008 Summer Olympics
Basketball players at the 2012 Summer Olympics
Brose Bamberg players
Cairns Taipans players
Commonwealth Games gold medallists for Australia
Commonwealth Games medallists in basketball
Gold Coast Blaze players
KK Radnički Kragujevac (2009–2014) players
Loyola Marymount Lions men's basketball coaches
Melbourne Tigers players
Melbourne United players
Metro State Roadrunners men's basketball players
Olympic basketball players of Australia
People from Bunbury, Western Australia
Piratas de Quebradillas players
Power forwards (basketball)
Small forwards
South Dragons players
Sydney Kings players
2006 FIBA World Championship players
2010 FIBA World Championship players
Medallists at the 2006 Commonwealth Games